Type II iodothyronine deiodinase (iodothyronine 5'-deiodinase, iodothyronine 5'-monodeiodinase) is an enzyme that in humans is encoded by the DIO2 gene.

Function 

The protein encoded by this gene belongs to the iodothyronine deiodinase family. It activates thyroid hormone by converting the prohormone thyroxine (T4) by outer ring deiodination (ORD) to bioactive 3,3',5-triiodothyronine (T3). It is highly expressed in the thyroid, and may contribute significantly to the relative increase in thyroidal T3 production in patients with Graves' disease and thyroid adenomas. This protein contains selenocysteine (Sec) residues encoded by the UGA codon, which normally signals translation termination. The 3' UTR of Sec-containing genes have a common stem-loop structure, the Sec insertion sequence (SECIS), which is necessary for the recognition of UGA as a Sec codon rather than as a stop signal. Alternative splicing results in multiple transcript variants encoding different isoforms.

Interactions 

DIO2 has been shown to interact with USP33.

See also
 Deiodinase

References

Further reading

Selenoproteins